A Small Deadly Space is the second and final studio album by heavy metal band Fight, released in April 1995. A music video was made for "Blowout in the Radio Room". The album exudes a march darker and grungier sound than its predecessor.

Track listing
Lyrics written by Rob Halford and Brian Tilse except where noted.

Notes
 "In a World of My Own Making" is a 7:06 song. A 2 minute silence occurs before a hidden track titled "Psycho Suicide" plays

2008 Remixed and Remastered edition

Personnel
Fight
 Rob Halford – vocals
 Brian Tilse – guitars, piano
 Mark Chaussee – guitars
 Jay Jay – bass
 Scott Travis – drums

Production
 Produced by Attie Bauw and Rob Halford
 Executive producer – John Baxter
 Recorded by Attie Bauw
2008 Remixed and Remastered Edition
Remixed by Roy Z
Remastered by Maor Appelbaum
Art design – Marc Sasso

Charts
Album – Billboard (United States)

References

Fight (band) albums
1995 albums
Epic Records albums